The Proud Twins is a 1979 Hong Kong film adapted from Gu Long's novel Juedai Shuangjiao. The film was directed by Chor Yuen, produced by the Shaw Brothers Studio, and starred Alexander Fu and Ng Wai-kwok as the lead characters.

Cast

Alexander Fu as Jiang Xiaoyu (Xiaoyu'er)
Ng Wai-kwok as Hua Wuque
Wong Yung as Yan Nantian
Wen Hsueh-erh as Tie Xinlan
Susanna Au-yeung as Murong Jing
Kitty Meng as Yaoyue
Tang Ching as Jiang Biehe / Jiang Qin
Ku Kuan-chung as Jiang Yulang
Cheng Miu as Wan Chuliu
Chan Shen as Ten Villains' chief
Lau Wai-ling as Xiao Mimi
Jamie Luk
Yuen Bun
Lun Ga-chun
Lam Fai-wong
Lee Ging-fan
Yeung Chi-hing
Ngai Fei
Wong Chi-wa
Wong Ching-ho
Ting Tung
Chai Lam
Tam Bo
Wong Chi-ming
Sek Gong
Wong Pau-gei
Ho Hon-chau
Hung Ling-ling
Gam Tin-chue
Sai Gwa-pau
To Wing-leung
Kwan Yan
Fung Ming
Cheung Chok-chow

External links

1979 films
Hong Kong martial arts films
Wuxia films
Shaw Brothers Studio films
Works based on Juedai Shuangjiao
Films directed by Chor Yuen
Films based on works by Gu Long
1970s Hong Kong films